Hagahöjdens BK is a Swedish football club located in Norrköping.

Background
Hagahöjdens BK currently plays in Division 4 Östergötland Östra which is the sixth tier of Swedish football. They play their home matches at the Himmelstalund Norra in Norrköping.

The club is affiliated to Östergötlands Fotbollförbund.

Season to season

Footnotes

External links
 Hagahöjdens BK – Official website
 Hagahöjdens BK on Facebook

Sport in Östergötland County
Football clubs in Östergötland County
Association football clubs established in 1945
1945 establishments in Sweden